Lalgarh may refer to:

 Lalgarh, Jhargram, a village in Midnapore district of West Bengal, India
 Lalgarh, Rajasthan, a village in tehsil Bidasar of Churu district in Rajasthan, India
 Lalgarh Palace, a palace in Bikaner in the  state of Rajasthan, India
 Lalgarh Junction railway station, the main railway station in Churu district, Rajasthan, India